The State Flag of Republic of the Union of Myanmar was adopted on 21 October 2010, it is the only tricolour flag in Asia to utilize the colours of red, yellow and green in its design.

Current flag since 2010 
The State Flag described in the 2008 Constitution of the Republic of the Union of Myanmar was adopted by enacting the 2010 Union Flag Law and the repealing of the 1974 State Flag Law on 21 October 2010. It was hoisted for the first time at 3:00 p.m. local time on 21 October 2010. Orders were also handed out to ensure all old flags were burned.

Unlike the previous 1974 State Flag Law, the 2010 Union Flag Law includes the definition of the flag. The current flag is a horizontal tricolour flag of yellow, green, and red charged with a five-pointed white star in the centre of the field. The background is a yellow, green, and red tricolor, meant to honour the tricolours used during the independence struggle. The yellow represents unity, conformity, wisdom, happiness, and unity of all national races amicably. The green symbolises fertility, conformity,
fairness, and being a peaceful, pleasant, and green nation. The red represents bravery and decisiveness. The white star stands for purity, honesty,
fullness of compassion, and power.

Previous flags (1948–2010) 
The two flags used by the country immediately before the 2010 flag both originated in the Burmese Resistance, which adopted a red flag with a white star when fighting the occupying Japanese forces during World War II.

1948 flag 

The National Flag of the Union of Burma was designed by Maung Win and adopted by the Constituent Assembly of the Union of Burma in August 1947. It was hoisted for the first time at 4:25 AM on 4 January 1948 when Burma gained independence. The flag consisted of a red field defaced with a blue canton. The blue canton was charged with one large white star surrounded by five smaller stars between its rays. The big white star in the canton and the red field honour the Resistance Flag and indicate the anti-fascist struggle. The four small white stars between the rays of the big white star symbolize the unity of various ethnic races of the republican union founded as a result of the resistance. The red represents bravery, courage, and preservation. The blue canton means the nature of the sky, having deep meanings, the fresh and clear mind, and the light emitted in the night sky. The usage of stars is for the nature of the stars: never stopping, never cancelling the chosen path, always moving forward, being a guide for travellers, and existing since the beginning of the world, while the colour white represents purity, righteousness and steadiness. This flag has a ratio of 5:9 in which the canton has a ratio of 2:4. On 3 January 1974, it was replaced by the State Flag of the Socialist Republic of the Union of Burma.

1974 flag 

The State Flag adopted on 3 January 1974 upon the coming into force of the Constitution of the Socialist Republic of the Union of Burma has a similar ratio and background colours as the previous flag but with different charge in the canton. The colour representations are also different: white is for purity and virtue, red for bravery and decisiveness, blue for peacefulness and steadiness. It depicts 14 equal-sized white stars encircling a pinion with 14 cogs and ear of paddy with 34 grains superimposed on it (each star on each cog of the pinion) in a blue canton against a red field. The paddy represents farmers while the pinion represents workers; the combination symbolizes the farmers and workers as the basic social classes for building the State. The 14 equal-sized white stars represent the equality and unity of the 14 members (7 states and 7 divisions) of the Union. 

The 14-star flag was hung upside down during the 8888 Uprising of 1988 by demonstrators as a sign of protest against the military government. Despite its association with the period of military rule under Ne Win and later the State Peace and Development Council, the 1974 flag is used by demonstrators in the 2021 Myanmar protests, alongside the 1948 flag.

Vertical style

Current flag 
When hanging or depicting vertically, the yellow must be on left and the star must point to left.

Previous flags

1948 flag 
When hanging or depicting vertically, the blue canton must be in the upper hoist, and the stars in the canton must point to the left.

Influence of pre-independence anti-colonial flags

The Tricolours 
In 1930, the Dobama Asiayone adopted a tricolour of yellow, green and red. In 1935, a peacock was added in the centre of the tricolour. In 1938, the leftists from Dobama Asiayone replaced the peacock with a hammer and sickle. Both of the tricolours were widely used by anti-colonialists during British rule. The peacock flag was also used by the Burma Independence Army and the State of Burma adopted it as the national flag from 1943 to 1945. In 1943, a stylized version of the peacock was introduced. This version was used by the Burma Defense Army (with the peacock in red) and as a variant of the national flag by the State of Burma (with the peacock in gold). There are two songs with the same name, "" (meaning: "Tricolour Song"), composed by two different composers about the meaning behind the Tricolour symbolism and the hope of Burmese people.

In these tricolours, the color yellow symbolizes the Sasana (Buddhism) and education, green represents staple grains, crops, minerals and jewelry, red signifies bravery or courage, and the peacock represents the Konbaung. The hammer and sickle represent workers and peasants, respectively.

The Resistance Flag
In 1945, when the Burma National Army changed sides and fought together with local resistance forces against the Japanese. A new flag, with a red field charged with a white star in the upper hoist, was adopted as the "Resistance Flag."

Influences 
The tricolours and the resistance flag have been depicted as "national flags" together with the pre-colonial and post-independence national flags. The resistance flag is referred and honoured by the 1948–1974 flag, while all the tricolours are referred and honoured by the current flag.

Proposals

1947 proposals 
In 1947, the Constituent Assembly of the Union of Burma formed a preparatory committee for State flag, State seal and State anthem. That committee held a flag design contest, and the flag designed by Maung Win won the first prize. There was a dispute at the committee's meeting in August 1947 whether or not the peacock should be added further to the proposed State flag; but after long discussions, the committee decided that the peacock should be rejected.

2006–2007 proposals 
A new design for the national flag was proposed on 10 November 2006 during a constitutional convention. The new flag would have consisted of three equally sized green, yellow, and red horizontal stripes, with a white star in the hoist end of the green stripe.

In September 2007, another new design was proposed with a larger white star in the middle and with the stripes in a different order, namely: yellow, green, and red. The proposal was a version of Burmese Tricolour with the white star.

The flag proposed in September 2007 was included in the new constitution, and was accepted with the 2008 referendum.

2019 proposals 
The ruling National League for Democracy (NLD) proposed a series of constitutional amendments in July 2019, including one to change the national flag. Four political parties, the NLD, SNLD, ZCD and NUP proposed four new designs for the flag. The NLD proposed changing the national flag as they do not believe that the flag adopted in 2010 has the full support of the people of Myanmar. Their proposed flag was based on the flag adopted by the country at independence and consisted of a red field with a blue canton in the upper hoist. Within the blue canton is a large white star representing the union which is surrounded by 14 smaller white stars representing the states and regions of the country.

Flags before 1948

Ensigns

Gallery

See also 

 List of Burmese flags
 State Seal of Myanmar
 The similar flag of Lithuania

References

External links 

 
 Timeline Flag of Myanmar

 
National symbols of Myanmar
Myanmar
National flags